The Saint Nicholas the Wonderworker Church is a Russian Orthodox Church in the city of Taganrog in Rostov Oblast, Russia.

History
The Saint Nicholas Church is the oldest Russian Orthodox church in Taganrog. It was erected in 1778 at the request of rear-admiral Fedot Klokachev who commanded the Azov Flotilla, and was dedicated to Saint Nicholas, who is considered as the patron saint of all sailors.

In 1855, during the Siege of Taganrog, the building of the church was shelled by the British and French warships. The cannonballs that were stuck in its walls were discovered during one of the renovations and were purposely left for display.

In 1941 the church was severely damaged during occupation of Taganrog, after the end of war it was not used and gradually deteriorated. It was reconstructed in the early 1990s.

Canonization of Saint Pavel of Taganrog

On 20 June 1999 the Russian Orthodox Church canonized Blessed Pavel. The saint starets' relics were transferred from his Kelya on Ulitsa Turgenevskaya in Taganrog into the St.Nicholas church. Today many people come from all corners of Russia to the Saint Pavel of Taganrog's shrine with his holy relics that are kept at the Saint Nicholas Church. Many people saw and remember a unique aureole in the sky over the Saint Nicholas Church in Taganrog on the day of Blessed Pavel's canonization. The chapel at the old cemetery is never empty; the lamps in front of holy icons in his keliya never die down.

The bell of Chersonesos

The bell of Chersonesos or "the fog bell of Chersonesos" is considered by many as "one of Taganrog's sights located abroad", which even became a symbol of another city - Sevastopol or to be more exact, the symbol of Chersonesos Taurica.

The fog bell was cast in 1778 from the trophy Turkish cannons seized by the Russian Imperial Army during Russo-Turkish War (1768–1774). Year 1778, month of August, on the date of ....".

The bell was cast before the foundation of Sevastopol for the Saint Nicholas church in Taganrog, which was the Russian Navy's military base at that time. Until 1803 the St.Nicholas church was subordinated to the Navy ministry. After Sevastopol became main Russian navy base in the South of Russia, the Emperor Alexander I ordered the bell to be transported to Sevastopol to be fitted in the Church of St. Nicholas which was being constructed there, with other bells and church plates also given over to the city of Sevastopol.

During the Crimean War the fog bell was seized by the French and was placed in the cathedral of Notre-Dame of Paris. Many years later, a bell with a Russian inscription was found and finally thanks to diplomatic efforts undertaken by both sides, and especially by the French consul in Sevastopol Louis Ge. The bell was solemnly returned to monastery at Chersonesos on September 13, 1913 and was placed on a temporary wooden belfry near the St. Vladimir Cathedral. The French President Raymond Poincaré in his letter to consul Louis Ge wrote that he returned the bell to Russia "as a sign of alliance and friendship." In their turn, the Russian government awarded the French consul the Order of St. Vladimir of the 4th degree.

The monastery was closed in 1925 by the new authorities, and two years later all its bells were sent away to be recast. Only one bell escaped this sad fate because the Department of the Security of Navigation of the Black and Azov Seas proposed to place it on the coast as a signal fog bell. In this quality the bell served until the 1960s.

External links and references
 Таганрог. Энциклопедия, Таганрог, издательство АНТОН, 2008
 Official web site

Buildings and structures in Taganrog
Churches completed in 1778
18th-century Eastern Orthodox church buildings
Tourist attractions in Taganrog
Churches in Rostov Oblast
Cultural heritage monuments in Taganrog
Russian Orthodox church buildings in Russia